Dainichi may refer to:

Dainichi Nyorai, the Japanese version of Vairocana, one of the Five Dhyani Buddhas
Dainichi Station, the terminus of Osaka's Tanimachi Line (谷町線)